Henry Bristow (June 5, 1840 – October 11, 1906) was a Republican U.S. Representative from New York.

Life Before Politics
Born in São Miguel Island, Azores, Bristow immigrated to the United States with his parents, who settled in Brooklyn, New York.
He attended public and private schools.
He served as a private in Company B, Seventh Regiment, New York State Militia, from April 26, 1861, to June 3, 1861, and engaged in mercantile pursuits until 1896.
He was appointed city magistrate in 1896.
He served as a member of the board of education of Brooklyn from 1880 to 1889.

Political career
Bristow was elected as a Republican to the Fifty-seventh Congress (March 4, 1901 – March 3, 1903).
He was an unsuccessful candidate for reelection in 1902 to the Fifty-eighth Congress.
He was appointed public administrator of Brooklyn, New York, in 1904 and served until his death in that city October 11, 1906.
He was interred in Green-Wood Cemetery.

References

1840 births
1906 deaths
Burials at Green-Wood Cemetery
Republican Party members of the United States House of Representatives from New York (state)
19th-century American politicians
Portuguese emigrants to the United States